Resaca is the name given to a type of oxbow lake in the southern half of Cameron County, Texas. The resacas constitute former channels of the Rio Grande and are naturally cut off from the river, having no inlet or outlet.

History 
The Rio Grande's water moves from Colorado to the Gulf of Mexico. Every year during spring, melted snow would flow into the Rio Grande, bringing seasonal flood waters to the most southern tip of Texas. Given the overflow of the river's main and distributary channel banks, the Rio Grande would carve new river channels, resacas. When the seasonal flooding ended and the river retreated, the newly formed oxbow lakes remained, creating resacas all throughout the Rio Grande Valley. There are only 5 remaining resacas in Cameron County.

Word origins 
There are two explanations for the origin of the word resaca. The first explanation holds that it is a contraction of the Spanish phrase rio seco (dry river). The second explanation is that the word stems from the Spanish word resacar (to retake). The latter is the most plausible explanation given that the primary geological function of a resaca is to divert and dissipate floodwater from the river.

The word resaca is a regionalism. Elsewhere, these are referred to as oxbow lakes.

See also
 Bayside Resaca Area
 Resaca de la Guerra
 Resaca de la Palma State Park
 Resaca de la Palma
 Resaca de los Cuates
 Resaca de los Fresnos
 Resaca del Rancho Viejo
 Resaca Rancho Viejo
 Sabal Palm Sanctuary

References

External links

Oxbow lakes
Lakes of Texas
Bodies of water of Cameron County, Texas